Austin Williams is an American soap opera actor. In 2005, Austin was cast in the film The Good Shepherd, which starred Matt Damon, as the young version of Damon's character Edward Wilson.  In October 2007, he was cast in the role of Shane Morasco on One Life to Live, a role that continued until January 2012.  In 2008, he was nominated for a Young Artist Award for "Best Performance in a Feature Film - Young Actor Age Ten or Younger" for his role as Henry Clayton in the 2007 film Michael Clayton.

In 2012, at the 33rd Young Artist Awards, Austin was nominated for his performance in A Gifted Man and won for his performance in One Life to Live.

Filmography

Awards and nominations

References

External links

1996 births
Living people
American male soap opera actors
American male child actors
American male voice actors